Century Club of Scranton is a historic women's club located at Scranton, Lackawanna County, Pennsylvania. It was built in 1913-1914, and is a three-story, rectangular, brick, limestone and wood building in the Colonial Revival-style.  It measures 56 feet, 6 inches, by 92 feet, 4 inches, and has a flat roof and three bay symmetrical facade.  It features an entry portico supported by groupings of three Doric order columns at the two front corners.

It was added to the National Register of Historic Places in 1996.

See also 
Scranton Club

References

Women's club buildings
Clubhouses on the National Register of Historic Places in Pennsylvania
Colonial Revival architecture in Pennsylvania
Buildings and structures completed in 1914
Buildings and structures in Scranton, Pennsylvania
National Register of Historic Places in Lackawanna County, Pennsylvania
History of women in Pennsylvania